The Braille pattern dots-1235 is a 6-dot braille cell with dots  raised, or an 8-dot braille cell with  raised. It is represented by the Unicode code point U+2817, and in Braille ASCII with an R.

Unified Braille

In unified international braille, the braille pattern dots-1235 is used to represent coronal or dorsal flaps, trills, or approximant consonants such as /r/, /ɹ/, /ɽ/, or /ʀ/.

Table of unified braille values

Other braille

Plus dots 7 and 8

Related to Braille pattern dots-1235 are Braille patterns 12357, 12358, and 123578, which are used in 8-dot braille systems, such as Gardner-Salinas and Luxembourgish Braille.

related 8-dot kantenji patterns

In the Japanese kantenji braille, the standard 8-dot Braille patterns 2367, 12367, 23467, and 123467 are the patterns related to Braille pattern dots-1235, since the two additional dots of kantenji patterns 01235, 12357, and 012357 are placed above the base 6-dot cell, instead of below, as in standard 8-dot braille.

Kantenji using braille patterns 2367, 12367, 23467, or 123467

This listing includes kantenji using Braille pattern dots-1235 for all 6349 kanji found in JIS C 6226-1978.

  - 竹

Variants and thematic compounds

  -  selector 4 + ち/竹  =  也
  -  selector 6 + ち/竹  =  采
  -  selector 6 + selector 6 + ち/竹  =  釆
  -  ち/竹 + selector 1  =  雨
  -  ち/竹 + selector 4  =  両
  -  数 + ち/竹  =  父

Compounds of 竹

  -  た/⽥ + ち/竹  =  笛
  -  れ/口 + ち/竹  =  筈
  -  と/戸 + ち/竹  =  箸
  -  ま/石 + ち/竹  =  篭
  -  ち/竹 + か/金  =  竿
  -  ち/竹 + け/犬  =  笑
  -  ち/竹 + ま/石  =  笠
  -  ち/竹 + ま/石 + 心  =  籠
  -  ち/竹 + な/亻  =  符
  -  ち/竹 + ゆ/彳  =  第
  -  ち/竹 + ふ/女  =  筆
  -  ち/竹 + し/巿  =  等
  -  ち/竹 + ⺼  =  筋
  -  ち/竹 + こ/子  =  筍
  -  ち/竹 + く/艹  =  筑
  -  ち/竹 + と/戸  =  筒
  -  ち/竹 + 囗  =  答
  -  ち/竹 + 数  =  策
  -  ち/竹 + れ/口  =  箇
  -  ち/竹 + ら/月  =  管
  -  ち/竹 + め/目  =  箱
  -  ち/竹 + さ/阝  =  節
  -  き/木 + ち/竹 + さ/阝  =  櫛
  -  ち/竹 + む/車  =  範
  -  ち/竹 + 龸  =  築
  -  ち/竹 + そ/馬  =  篤
  -  ち/竹 + 日  =  簡
  -  ち/竹 + て/扌  =  簿
  -  ち/竹 + ね/示  =  籍
  -  ち/竹 + ゐ/幺  =  纂
  -  ち/竹 + ら/月 + ぬ/力  =  箭
  -  て/扌 + 宿 + ち/竹  =  擶
  -  ち/竹 + 宿 + い/糹/#2  =  竺
  -  ち/竹 + selector 1 + お/頁  =  笂
  -  ち/竹 + 宿 + と/戸  =  笄
  -  ち/竹 + selector 5 + ひ/辶  =  笆
  -  ち/竹 + selector 4 + ゐ/幺  =  笈
  -  ち/竹 + ⺼ + つ/土  =  笊
  -  ち/竹 + selector 6 + い/糹/#2  =  笋
  -  ち/竹 + selector 4 + 数  =  笏
  -  ち/竹 + れ/口 + と/戸  =  笘
  -  ち/竹 + せ/食 + い/糹/#2  =  笙
  -  ち/竹 + selector 4 + な/亻  =  笞
  -  ち/竹 + selector 4 + 仁/亻  =  笥
  -  ち/竹 + き/木 + selector 6  =  笨
  -  ち/竹 + ぬ/力 + れ/口  =  笳
  -  ち/竹 + 宿 + さ/阝  =  笵
  -  ち/竹 + や/疒 + selector 2  =  笶
  -  ち/竹 + つ/土 + 龸  =  筅
  -  ち/竹 + り/分 + へ/⺩  =  筌
  -  ち/竹 + 宿 + 囗  =  筏
  -  ち/竹 + へ/⺩ + selector 1  =  筐
  -  ち/竹 + 龸 + そ/馬  =  筝
  -  ち/竹 + selector 6 + み/耳  =  筥
  -  ち/竹 + め/目 + 宿  =  筧
  -  ち/竹 + せ/食 + ひ/辶  =  筬
  -  ち/竹 + 仁/亻 + ふ/女  =  筮
  -  ち/竹 + 仁/亻 + さ/阝  =  筰
  -  ち/竹 + 仁/亻 + ゆ/彳  =  筱
  -  ち/竹 + selector 5 + な/亻  =  筴
  -  ち/竹 + は/辶 + selector 1  =  筵
  -  ち/竹 + 龸 + へ/⺩  =  筺
  -  ち/竹 + 宿 + 比  =  箆
  -  ち/竹 + selector 4 + 囗  =  箋
  -  ち/竹 + 宿 + て/扌  =  箍
  -  ち/竹 + そ/馬 + 宿  =  箏
  -  ち/竹 + 宿 + り/分  =  箒
  -  ち/竹 + 氷/氵 + 日  =  箔
  -  ち/竹 + selector 4 + き/木  =  箕
  -  ち/竹 + 龸 + 囗  =  箘
  -  ち/竹 + ら/月 + ゐ/幺  =  箙
  -  ち/竹 + り/分 + 囗  =  箚
  -  ち/竹 + う/宀/#3 + き/木  =  箜
  -  ち/竹 + selector 4 + る/忄  =  箝
  -  ち/竹 + 日 + 比  =  箟
  -  ち/竹 + れ/口 + れ/口  =  箪
  -  ち/竹 + ひ/辶 + selector 3  =  箴
  -  ち/竹 + 日 + へ/⺩  =  篁
  -  ち/竹 + 宿 + そ/馬  =  篆
  -  ち/竹 + 宿 + へ/⺩  =  篇
  -  ち/竹 + 宿 + な/亻  =  篋
  -  ち/竹 + 仁/亻 + や/疒  =  篌
  -  ち/竹 + ん/止 + selector 1  =  篏
  -  ち/竹 + 宿 + む/車  =  篝
  -  ち/竹 + 心 + に/氵  =  篥
  -  ち/竹 + 龸 + 比  =  篦
  -  ち/竹 + し/巿 + ら/月  =  篩
  -  ち/竹 + 宿 + た/⽥  =  篳
  -  ち/竹 + 宿 + ん/止  =  篶
  -  ち/竹 + ひ/辶 + ほ/方  =  篷
  -  ち/竹 + へ/⺩ + を/貝  =  簀
  -  ち/竹 + ほ/方 + や/疒  =  簇
  -  ち/竹 + 宿 + る/忄  =  簍
  -  ち/竹 + 宿 + ね/示  =  簑
  -  ち/竹 + selector 2 + む/車  =  簒
  -  ち/竹 + 囗 + う/宀/#3  =  簓
  -  ち/竹 + 龸 + ね/示  =  簔
  -  ち/竹 + 宿 + き/木  =  簗
  -  ち/竹 + 日 + ろ/十  =  簟
  -  ち/竹 + を/貝 + き/木  =  簣
  -  ち/竹 + し/巿 + こ/子  =  簧
  -  ち/竹 + 宿 + 日  =  簪
  -  ち/竹 + ぬ/力 + ゆ/彳  =  簫
  -  ち/竹 + 龸 + 日  =  簷
  -  ち/竹 + selector 4 + ひ/辶  =  簸
  -  ち/竹 + selector 6 + り/分  =  簽
  -  ち/竹 + よ/广 + け/犬  =  簾
  -  ち/竹 + 龸 + ら/月  =  籀
  -  ち/竹 + す/発 + ⺼  =  籃
  -  ち/竹 + へ/⺩ + し/巿  =  籌
  -  ち/竹 + ほ/方 + き/木  =  籏
  -  ち/竹 + 宿 + 数  =  籔
  -  ち/竹 + 龸 + み/耳  =  籖
  -  ち/竹 + 宿 + ふ/女  =  籘
  -  ち/竹 + お/頁 + 数  =  籟
  -  ち/竹 + 宿 + み/耳  =  籤
  -  ち/竹 + た/⽥ + ち/竹  =  籥
  -  ち/竹 + う/宀/#3 + い/糹/#2  =  籬

Compounds of 也

  -  な/亻 + ち/竹  =  他
  -  つ/土 + ち/竹  =  地
  -  ゆ/彳 + ち/竹  =  弛
  -  に/氵 + ち/竹  =  池
  -  ほ/方 + ち/竹  =  施
  -  心 + ほ/方 + ち/竹  =  葹
  -  そ/馬 + ち/竹  =  馳
  -  か/金 + selector 4 + ち/竹  =  釶
  -  と/戸 + selector 4 + ち/竹  =  髢

Compounds of 采 and 釆

  -  て/扌 + ち/竹  =  採
  -  く/艹 + ち/竹  =  菜
  -  ち/竹 + う/宀/#3  =  彩
  -  ち/竹 + 宿 + 心  =  悉
  -  い/糹/#2 + 宿 + ち/竹  =  綵

Compounds of 雨

  -  ち/竹 + え/訁  =  雲
  -  日 + ち/竹  =  曇
  -  つ/土 + 日 + ち/竹  =  壜
  -  ん/止 + 日 + ち/竹  =  罎
  -  い/糹/#2 + ち/竹 + え/訁  =  繧
  -  氷/氵 + ち/竹  =  漏
  -  ち/竹 + せ/食  =  雪
  -  ⺼ + ち/竹 + せ/食  =  膤
  -  ふ/女 + ち/竹 + せ/食  =  艝
  -  む/車 + ち/竹 + せ/食  =  轌
  -  せ/食 + ち/竹 + せ/食  =  鱈
  -  ち/竹 + り/分  =  雰
  -  ち/竹 + ん/止  =  零
  -  に/氵 + ち/竹 + ん/止  =  澪
  -  ち/竹 + た/⽥  =  雷
  -  て/扌 + ち/竹 + た/⽥  =  擂
  -  く/艹 + ち/竹 + た/⽥  =  蕾
  -  ち/竹 + も/門  =  雹
  -  ち/竹 + 心  =  電
  -  ち/竹 + の/禾  =  需
  -  ふ/女 + ち/竹 + の/禾  =  嬬
  -  こ/子 + ち/竹 + の/禾  =  孺
  -  る/忄 + ち/竹 + の/禾  =  懦
  -  の/禾 + ち/竹 + の/禾  =  糯
  -  い/糹/#2 + ち/竹 + の/禾  =  繻
  -  ⺼ + ち/竹 + の/禾  =  臑
  -  む/車 + ち/竹 + の/禾  =  蠕
  -  ね/示 + ち/竹 + の/禾  =  襦
  -  ち/竹 + ろ/十  =  震
  -  ち/竹 + 仁/亻  =  霊
  -  ち/竹 + ち/竹 + 仁/亻  =  靈
  -  ち/竹 + き/木  =  霜
  -  ふ/女 + ち/竹 + き/木  =  孀
  -  ち/竹 + よ/广  =  霧
  -  ち/竹 + 氷/氵  =  霰
  -  ち/竹 + み/耳  =  露
  -  心 + ち/竹 + selector 1  =  樗
  -  き/木 + ち/竹 + selector 1  =  櫺
  -  や/疒 + ち/竹 + selector 1  =  癨
  -  む/車 + 宿 + ち/竹  =  轜
  -  ち/竹 + 比 + 龸  =  雫
  -  ち/竹 + そ/馬 + ⺼  =  霄
  -  ち/竹 + は/辶 + へ/⺩  =  霆
  -  ち/竹 + 宿 + し/巿  =  霈
  -  ち/竹 + selector 4 + い/糹/#2  =  霍
  -  ち/竹 + ふ/女 + ま/石  =  霎
  -  ち/竹 + selector 4 + 火  =  霏
  -  ち/竹 + 宿 + に/氵  =  霑
  -  ち/竹 + こ/子 + 宿  =  霓
  -  ち/竹 + き/木 + き/木  =  霖
  -  ち/竹 + く/艹 + お/頁  =  霙
  -  ち/竹 + 宿 + の/禾  =  霞
  -  ち/竹 + 氷/氵 + に/氵  =  霪
  -  ち/竹 + 宿 + ら/月  =  霸
  -  ち/竹 + 宿 + ま/石  =  霹
  -  ち/竹 + さ/阝 + 龸  =  霽
  -  ち/竹 + 比 + り/分  =  霾
  -  ち/竹 + こ/子 + ん/止  =  靂
  -  ち/竹 + 宿 + 氷/氵  =  靄
  -  ち/竹 + ひ/辶 + ゆ/彳  =  靆
  -  ち/竹 + 龸 + selector 1  =  靉

Compounds of 両

  -  む/車 + う/宀/#3 + ち/竹  =  輌
  -  ち/竹 + ち/竹 + selector 4  =  兩
  -  な/亻 + ち/竹 + selector 4  =  倆
  -  ね/示 + ち/竹 + selector 4  =  裲
  -  む/車 + ち/竹 + selector 4  =  輛
  -  お/頁 + ち/竹 + selector 4  =  魎

Compounds of 父

  -  め/目 + 龸 + ち/竹  =  爻
  -  龸 + ち/竹  =  交
  -  き/木 + ち/竹  =  校
  -  い/糹/#2 + ち/竹  =  絞
  -  い/糹/#2 + 龸 + ち/竹  =  纐
  -  む/車 + ち/竹  =  較
  -  さ/阝 + ち/竹  =  郊
  -  ち/竹 + ぬ/力  =  効
  -  な/亻 + 龸 + ち/竹  =  佼
  -  れ/口 + 龸 + ち/竹  =  咬
  -  け/犬 + 龸 + ち/竹  =  狡
  -  日 + 龸 + ち/竹  =  皎
  -  む/車 + 龸 + ち/竹  =  蛟
  -  そ/馬 + 龸 + ち/竹  =  駮
  -  せ/食 + 龸 + ち/竹  =  鮫
  -  せ/食 + 宿 + ち/竹  =  餃
  -  ち/竹 + ち/竹 + ぬ/力  =  效
  -  ち/竹 + 宿 + せ/食  =  鵁
  -  か/金 + ち/竹  =  釜
  -  ち/竹 + お/頁  =  斧
  -  ち/竹 + や/疒  =  爺
  -  か/金 + 宿 + ち/竹  =  釡

Other compounds

  -  や/疒 + ち/竹  =  墾
  -  ち/竹 + を/貝  =  乳
  -  る/忄 + ち/竹  =  悩
  -  る/忄 + る/忄 + ち/竹  =  惱
  -  ⺼ + ち/竹  =  脳
  -  ⺼ + ⺼ + ち/竹  =  腦
  -  へ/⺩ + 宿 + ち/竹  =  瑙
  -  ま/石 + 宿 + ち/竹  =  碯

Notes

Braille patterns